The Magic Foxhole is an unpublished short story by J. D. Salinger.

Plot
The story, told in the first-person by a narrator named Garrity, takes place days after D-Day. Garrity describes a friend of his, another soldier named Gardner, who is suffering from battle fatigue. Gardner is in the hospital, hallucinating. He sees a soldier in his room dressed in a futuristic uniform with weaponry he doesn't recognize. Garrity finds out that the soldier he sees is in fact Gardner's son (who has not been born yet) about to go into combat during World War II. Gardner tells Garrity he must kill him, to prevent him from dying in combat and hopefully preventing the future war. The story ends abruptly with Garrity leaving the hospital, while Gardner screams in horror.

History
The 21 page story was written in 1944 while Salinger was in the service, and was submitted to The New Yorker but rejected. The story is noteworthy for its graphic descriptions of the combat during the D-Day invasion. Salinger noted in at least one letter he believed the piece was a demonstration of the "psychological drama" he began to place in his character's heads, particularly war veterans. He had a high opinion of the piece, which will not be published until 2060, and after much discussion it was planned to be included in the collection he arranged with Whit Burnett and Story Press' Lippincott imprint, but the deal fell through, much to the author's consternation.

References

Short stories by J. D. Salinger
1944 short stories